Kalle Karlsson of Jularbo (Swedish: Kalle Karlsson från Jularbo) is a 1952 Swedish musical drama film directed by Ivar Johansson and starring Kenne Fant, Rut Holm and Ingrid Thulin. It is a biopic loosely based on the life and music of the accordion player Carl Jularbo. It was shot at the Centrumateljéerna Studios in Stockholm. The film's sets were designed by the art director P.A. Lundgren.

Cast
 Jan-Olof Lindstedt as Kalle, lillpojken
 Ola Lendahl as Kalle, mellanpojken
 Kenne Fant as 	Kalle, från 17 år 
 Ivar Hallbäck as 	Alfred Karlsson, Kalles far
 Rut Holm as Selma, Alfreds hustru, Kalles mor
 Britt-Marie Janssonas 	Inger, lillflickan
 Kerstin Dunér as Inger, stora tösen
 Ingrid Thulin as 	Elsa
 Stig Järrel as 	Direktör Andersson
 Ingrid Backlin as 	Hans fru
 Alf Östlundas 	Biografförevisaren
 Arne Källerud as 	En impressario
 Arthur Fischer as En annan dito
 Gustaf Lövås as Rallar-Svante 
 Torgny Anderberg as 	Accordion Player
 Astrid Bodin as 	Mrs. Bodell
 Helga Brofeldt as 	Peasant Woman
 Harald Emanuelsson as 	Värmlänning
 Siegfried Fischer as 	Concert Arranger
 Gustaf Färingborg as 	Lumberjack
 Eric Gustafson as 	Pettersson 
 Sten Hedlund as Kompanichef
 Gösta Holmström as Martin Fors
 Stig Johanson as 	Fjutt-Pelle 
 Arne Lindblad as Sundberg
 Martin Ljung as 	Frans Lundgren, Accordion Player
 Adèle Lundvall as 	Bondpiga
 Bellan Roos as 	Lill-Stina
 Sigyn Sahlin as Söt Bondpiga
 Georg Skarstedt as 	Provryttare
 Carl Skylling as Ole Gruttum

References

Bibliography 
 Qvist, Per Olov & von Bagh, Peter. Guide to the Cinema of Sweden and Finland. Greenwood Publishing Group, 2000.

External links 
 

1952 films
Swedish drama films
1952 drama films
1950s Swedish-language films
Films directed by Ivar Johansson
Swedish black-and-white films
Films set in Sweden
1950s Swedish films